Josh Nicholas (born 20 December 1991) is an Australian cricketer who debuted for Western Australia during the 2015–16 season.  He has previously played for Eckington and Ambergate Cricket Clubs in the Derbyshire Premier Cricket League and a single game for the Surrey Second XI.

Nicholas plays for the Perth Cricket Club in Western Australian Grade Cricket.

References

External links

1991 births
Australian cricketers
Cricketers from Western Australia
Living people
People educated at Trinity College, Perth
Western Australia cricketers